Březová may refer to places in the Czech Republic:

Březová (Beroun District), a municipality and village in the Central Bohemian Region
Březová (Karlovy Vary District), a municipality and village in the Karlovy Vary Region
Březová (Opava District), a market town in the Moravian-Silesian Region
Březová (Sokolov District), a town in the Karlovy Vary Region
Březová (Uherské Hradiště District), a municipality and village in the Zlín Region
Březová (Zlín District), a municipality and village in the Zlín Region
Březová nad Svitavou, a town in the Pardubice Region
Březová, a village and part of Březová-Oleško in the Central Bohemian Region
Březová, a village and part of Meziměstí in the Hradec Králové Region
Březová, a village and part of Úmonín in the Central Bohemian Region
Březová, a village and part of Všelibice in the Liberec Region

See also
Brezova (disambiguation)